Neil Reid is the first album, for Scottish Opportunity Knocks winner, Neil Reid. The album reached number 1 on the UK Albums Chart and the single "Mother of Mine" also peaked at number 2 in the UK Singles Chart.

Track listing
You're the Cream in My Coffee
On the Sunny Side of the Street
Peg O' My Heart
Ye Banks and Braes
Happy Heart
When I'm Sixty-Four
Look for the Silver Lining
If I Could Write a Song
When I Take My Sugar to Tea
My Mother's Eyes
I'm Gonna Knock on Your Door
The Sweetheart Tree
One Little Word Called Love
How Small We Are, How Little We Know
Ten Guitars
Mother of Mine

Charts

References

1972 albums